Nezim Allii was a notable criminal Boss of  the Nezim gang from Kumanovo, Macedonia. Nezim and the majority of his Gang were arrested in 2014 in his home town in a police action named "Kalabria". 350 Law enforcement officers participated in the arrest. He used most of his profit from drug smuggling to purchase real estate in Kosovo.

Companies
Kalabria Ferat DOOEL
Kalabri Kafe Picerija (pizzeria)
Kalabria Hotel
DPTU Petrol Kalabira (gas station)
DPTU Arizona Kompani (gas station)
Mlechen restoran (dairy restaurant)
DTPU Hotel Roma
Petrol Roma
Roma eden
Roma dva

See also
Macedonian mafia

References

External links
 Official police video from Kumanovo

Living people
Macedonian gangsters
People from Kumanovo
Year of birth missing (living people)